In Nazi Germany, Gottgläubig (literally: "believing in God") was a Nazi religious term for a form of non-denominationalism practised by those German citizens who had officially left Christian churches but professed faith in some higher power or divine creator. Such people were called Gottgläubige ("believers in God"), and the term for the overall movement was Gottgläubigkeit ("belief in God"); the term denotes someone who still believes in a God, although without having any institutional religious affiliation. These National Socialists were not favourable towards religious institutions of their time, nor did they tolerate atheism of any type within their ranks. The 1943 Philosophical Dictionary defined Gottgläubig as: "official designation for those who profess a specific kind of piety and morality, without being bound to a church denomination, whilst however also rejecting irreligion and godlessness." In the 1939 census, 3.5% of the German population identified as Gottgläubig.

Origins 

In the 1920 National Socialist Programme of the National Socialist German Workers' Party (NSDAP), Adolf Hitler first mentioned the phrase "Positive Christianity". The Nazi Party did not wish to tie itself to a particular Christian denomination but with Christianity in general, and sought freedom of religion for all denominations "so long as they do not endanger its existence or oppose the moral senses of the Germanic race." (point 24).

When Hitler and the NSDAP got into power in 1933, they sought to assert state control over the churches, on the one hand through the Reichskonkordat with the Roman Catholic Church, and the forced merger of the German Evangelical Church Confederation into the Protestant Reich Church on the other. This policy seems to have gone relatively well until late 1936, when a "gradual worsening of relations" between the Nazi Party and the churches saw the rise of Kirchenaustritt ("leaving the Church"). Although there was no top-down official directive to revoke church membership, some Nazi Party members started doing so voluntarily and put other members under pressure to follow their example. Those who left the churches were designated as Gottgläubige ("believers in God"), a term officially recognised by the Interior Minister Wilhelm Frick on 26 November 1936. He stressed that the term signified political disassociation from the churches, not an act of religious apostasy. The term "dissident", which some church leavers had used up until them, was associated with being "without belief" (glaubenslos), whilst most of them emphasized that they still believed in a God, and thus required a different word.

The Nazi Party ideologue Alfred Rosenberg was the first to leave his church on 15 November 1933, but for the next three years he would be the only prominent Nazi leader to do so. In early 1936, SS leaders Heinrich Himmler and Reinhard Heydrich terminated their membership of the Roman Catholic Church, followed by a number of Gauleiter including Martin Mutschmann (Saxony), Carl Röver (Weser-Ems), and Robert Heinrich Wagner (Baden). In late 1936, especially Roman Catholic party members left the church, followed in 1937 by a flood of primarily Protestant party members. Hitler himself never repudiated his membership of the Roman Catholic Church; in 1941, he told his General Gerhard Engel: "I am now as before a Catholic and will always be so." However, the shifting actual religious views of Adolf Hitler remain unclear due to conflicting accounts from Hitler's associates such as Otto Strasser, Martin Bormann, Joseph Goebbels, and others.

Demography 

People who identified as Gottgläubig could hold a wide range of religious beliefs, including non-clerical Christianity, Germanic Neopaganism, a generic non-Christian theism, deism, and pantheism. Strictly speaking, Gottgläubigen were not even required to terminate their church membership, but strongly encouraged to.

By the decree of the Reich Ministry of the Interior of 26 November 1936, this religious descriptor was officially recognised on government records. The census of 17 May 1939 was the first time that German citizens were able to officially register as Gottgläubig. Out of 79.4 million Germans, 2.7 million people (3.5%) claimed to be Gottgläubig, compared to 94.5% of Christians who either belonged to the Protestant or Catholic churches, 300,000 Jews (0.4%), 86,000 adherents of other religions (0.1%, including Germanic Neopagans, Buddhists, Hindus, Muslims, and other religious sects and movements), and 1.2 million (1.5%) who had no faith (glaubenslos). Paradoxically, Germans living in urban areas, where support for the Nazi Party was the lowest, were the most likely to identify as Gottgläubig, the five highest rates being found in Berlin (10.2%), Hamburg (7.5%), Vienna (6.4%), Düsseldorf (6.0%), and Essen (5.3%).

The term Gottgläubig still appeared sporadically a few years after the end of the Second World War, and was recognised in the 1946 census inside the French Occupation Zone, before it faded from official documents.

Himmler and the SS 

Reichsführer-SS Heinrich Himmler, himself a former Roman Catholic, was one of the main promoters of the Gottgläubig faith. He was particularly hostile towards Christianity, its values, the churches, and their clergy. However, Himmler declared: "As National Socialists, we believe in a Godly worldview." He insisted on the existence of a creator God, who favoured and guided the Third Reich and the German nation, as he announced to the SS: "We believe in a God Almighty who stands above us; he has created the Earth, the Fatherland, and the Volk, and he has sent us the Führer. Any human being who does not believe in God should be considered arrogant, megalomaniacal, and stupid and thus not suited for the SS." He did not allow atheists into the SS, arguing that their "refusal to acknowledge higher powers" would be a "potential source of indiscipline".

Himmler was not particularly concerned by the question how to label this higher power; God Almighty, the Ancient One, Destiny, "Waralda", Nature, etc. were all acceptable, as long as they referred to some "higher power that had created this world and endowed it with the laws of struggle and selection that guaranteed the continued existence of nature and the natural order of things." According to Himmler, "Only he who opposes belief in a higher power is considered godless"; everyone else was Gottgläubig, but should be thus outside of the church. SS members were put under pressure to identify as Gottgläubig and revoke their church membership, if necessary under the threat of expulsion.

The SS personnel records show that most of its members who left the churches of their upbringing, did so just before or shortly after joining the SS. The Sicherheitsdienst (SD) members were the most willing corps within the SS to withdraw from their Christian denominations and change their religious affiliation to the Gottgläubig faith at 90%. Of the SS officers, 74% of those who joined the SS before 1933 did so, while 68% who joined the SS after 1933 would eventually declare themselves Gottgläubige. Of the general SS membership, 16% had left their respective churches by the end of 1937.

See also 
Cult of the Supreme Being
Esotericism in Germany and Austria
German Christians (movement)
German Faith Movement
Heathenry (new religious movement)
Occultism in Nazism
Positive Christianity
Religion in Nazi Germany
Religious aspects of Nazism
Thule Society

References 

1930s in modern paganism
1940s in modern paganism
Conceptions of God
Deism
Germanic neopaganism
Modern paganism in Germany
Occultism in Nazism
Pantheism
Religion in Nazi Germany